Gav Sefid-e Kuchek (also Romanized as Gāv Sefīd-e Kūchek, Gāv Safīd-e Kūchak, and Gav Sefid Koochak) is a village in Rudhaleh Rural District, Rig District, Ganaveh County, Bushehr Province, Iran. At the 2006 census, its population was 84, in 20 families.

References 

Populated places in Ganaveh County